, commonly abbreviated as Fujikyu, is a passenger transportation company headquartered in Fujiyoshida, Yamanashi, Japan.

The company operates the Fujikyuko Line railway and regional and long-distance bus routes. The company also operates the Tenjō-Yama Park Mt. Kachi Kachi Ropeway, and Fuji-Q Highland amusement park.

Affiliated companies
The Gakunan Railway is a consolidated subsidiary of Fuji Kyuko because Fuji Kyuko makes a 25.59% investment in the company.
The Yamanashi Chuo Bank is made a 1.16% investment by Fuji Kyuko.

History
The company signed a "sister railway" agreement with the Matterhorn Gotthard Bahn in Switzerland in 1991.
On 1 April 2022, this company will surely establish Fuji Sanroku Denki Tetsudo and Fujikyuko Line will be transferred to the new corporation.

References

External links 

Railway companies of Japan
Bus companies of Japan